Egg case may refer to:
 Ootheca, an egg case made by some insects and molluscs
 Egg case (Chondrichthyes), an egg case made by some sharks, skates, and chimaeras